Kurshum Djamia Mosque is located in Karlovo, Plovdiv Province, Bulgaria. Kurshum Mosque was built in 1485 by Karlu Ali Bey. It is the oldest architectural monument in Karlovo.

See also
 Karlovo

References

External links

 Bulgarian police detain 120 after mosque attack
 4 Sentenced after Bulgaria Mosque Attack
 European Muslims respond to attacks on Mosque in Bulgaria
 Kursum-Mosque

Ottoman mosques in Bulgaria
Karlovo
Buildings and structures in Plovdiv Province